Musakhail can refer to:

 the Musakhel tribe of Afghanistan and Pakistan
 Musakhel District, Afghanistan, part of the province of Khost, Afghanistan
 Musakhel, Khost, the administrative centre of the district of the same name in the province of Khost, Afghanistan
 Musakhail District, Pakistan, part of the province of Balochistan, Pakistan
 Musakhel Bazar, an administrative centre of the district of the same name in the province of Balochistan, Pakistan
 Musakhel, Punjab, a village in Mianwali district in the province of Punjab, Pakistan